Ivan von Müller (20 May 1830 in Wunsiedel, Bavaria – 20 July 1917 in Munich) was a German classical philologist.

Biography
He studied philology at the University of Erlangen as a pupil of Ludwig Döderlein and Carl Friedrich Nagelsbach. Following graduation (1853), he worked as a secondary schoolteacher in Ansbach, Zweibrücken and Erlangen. In 1864 he succeeded Döderlein as chair of classical philology and pedagogy at the University of Erlangen, where as he also served as dean (1870/71, 1880/81) and vice-rector (1878/79). In 1893 he succeeded Rudolf Schöll as professor of classical philology at the University of Munich.

His published works are numerous. He was best known as general editor of the comprehensive "Handbuch der klassischen Altertumswissenschaft" ("Handbook of knowledge about classical antiquity"), and also for his critical editions of the works of Galen, and for his revision of Nagelsbach's "Lateinische Stilistik".

Notes

References

External links
 

1830 births
1917 deaths
People from Wunsiedel
People from the Kingdom of Bavaria
German classical philologists
Academic staff of the Ludwig Maximilian University of Munich
Academic staff of the University of Erlangen-Nuremberg